Eupithecia pyricoetes is a moth in the family Geometridae. It is found in Nepal, north-eastern India and Sikkim.

References

Moths described in 1958
pyricoetes
Moths of Asia